Channa ornatipinnis is a freshwater species of snakehead, a fish of the family Channidae. It is found in tropical Asia.

References

ornatipinnis
Fish of Asia
Fish described in 2008